was a Japanese painter, noted for development of yōga (Western-style) portraiture in early twentieth-century Japanese painting.

Biography
Yasui was born to a merchant class household in Kyoto, but dropped out of commercial high school against his family's wishes to pursue a career in the arts.  He studied oil painting under Asai Chū at the Shōgōin Yōga Kenkyujō and Kansai Bijutsu-in (Kansai Fine Art Academy) together with Ryuzaburo Umehara.

In 1907, at the age of nineteen he moved to Paris, France to study at the Académie Julian under Jean-Paul Laurens. During this seven years, from 1907 to 1914, he was strongly influenced by the realistic styles of Jean-François Millet, Pierre-Auguste Renoir and, in particular, Paul Cézanne. Forced to return to Japan with the outbreak of World War I, in 1915, he made his debut at the Nikakai (Second Division Society) Exhibition, where he displayed forty-four paintings he had made in Paris. For the next ten years, Yasui suffered from recurring health problems and did not participate in exhibitions, while he attempted to perfect his style, which incorporates clear outlines and vibrant colors in portraits and landscapes, combining western realism with the softer touches of traditional nihonga techniques. In 1930, he displayed these techniques in "A Portrait of a Woman" to wide critical acclaim, and was nominated for membership in the prestigious Imperial Fine Arts Academy in 1935.

From 1936, he cooperated with Ikuma Arishima to establish the Issui-kai, a rival organization to the Nikakai. In the postwar period, many of his works were selected as cover art for the literary magazine Bungeishunjū. From 1944, he was a professor at the Tokyo University of the Arts.  In 1952, he received the Order of Culture from the Japanese government. He died in 1955 of acute pneumonia. His grave is at Shokaku temple in Kyoto.

Noted works
, 1924, BB Plaza Art Museum
, 1930, Tokyo National Museum of Modern Art
, 1934, Tokyo National Museum of Modern Art

Bibliography
 Keene, Donald. Dawn to the West. Columbia University Press; (1998). 
 Mason, Penelope. History of Japanese Art . Prentice Hall (2005). 
 Miyoshi, Masao. Postmodernism and Japan. Duke University Press (1986) 
 Sadao, Tsuneko. Discovering the Arts of Japan: A Historical Overview. Kodansha International (2003). 
 Schaarschmidt Richte. Japanese Modern Art Painting From 1910 . Edition Stemmle. 
 Weisenfeld, Gennifer. MAVO: Japanese Artists and the Avant-Garde, 1905–1931. University of California Press (2001).

References

External links

Woman Head (1905)
Profile at Artnet

1888 births
1955 deaths
Artists from Kyoto
Académie Julian alumni
Japanese portrait painters
20th-century Japanese painters
Imperial household artists